The Eurasian bullfinch, common bullfinch or bullfinch (Pyrrhula pyrrhula) is a small passerine bird in the finch family, Fringillidae.  In Anglophone Europe it is known simply as the bullfinch, as it is the original bird to bear the name bullfinch.

Taxonomy and systematics
The Eurasian bullfinch was formally described in 1758 by Linnaeus in the 10th edition of his Systema Naturae under the binomial name Loxia pyrrhula. It is now placed in the genus Pyrrhula that was introduced in 1760 by the French zoologist Mathurin Jacques Brisson. The Latin word pyrrhula comes from the Greek πυρρός (a flame-coloured bird, from πυρρός flame coloured, from πυρ fire : Pyrrha), a 'worm eating bird' that is mentioned by Aristotle. The Latin name pyrrhula for the Eurasian bullfinch had been used in 1555 by the Swiss naturalist Conrad Gesner in his Historiae animalium.

Subspecies
Ten subspecies are recognised:
 P. p. pileata MacGillivray, W, 1837 – British Isles
 P. p. pyrrhula (Linnaeus, 1758) – north, south central and east Europe across to central Siberia 
 P. p. europaea Vieillot, 1816 – western Europe
 P. p. iberiae Voous, 1951 – southwest France, northern Iberian Peninsula
 P. p. rossikowi Derjugin & Bianchi, 1900 – northeast Turkey and the Caucasus
 P. p. cineracea Cabanis, 1872 (Baikal bullfinch) – west Siberia and northeast Kazakhstan to east Siberia and northeast China
 P. p. caspica Witherby, 1908 – Azerbaijan and north Iran
 P. p. cassinii Baird, SF, 1869 – east Siberia
 P. p. griseiventris Lafresnaye, 1841 – Kuril Islands and north Japan
 P. p. rosacea Seebohm, 1882 – Sakhalin (island north of Japan)

The Azores bullfinch (P. murina), previously regarded as a subspecies of the Eurasian bullfinch, is now recognised as a separate species.

Description
The Eurasian bullfinch is a bulky bull-headed bird. The upper parts are grey; the flight feathers and short thick bill are black; as are the cap and face in adults (they are greyish-brown in juveniles), and the white rump and wing bars are striking in flight. The adult male has red underparts, but females and young birds have grey-buff underparts. It moults between July and October, but males do not have the duller autumn plumage that is typical of some other finches. The song of this unobtrusive bird contains fluted whistles, and is often described as 'mournful'. This Bullfinch’s usual call is a quiet, low, melancholy whistled “peeu” or “pew.” The song is audible only at close range. It is a weak, scratchy warbling, alternating with soft whistles. Tamed bullfinches can be taught to repeat specific melodies.

Distribution and habitat
This bird breeds across Europe and temperate Asia. It is mainly resident, but many northern birds migrate further south in the winter.  Mixed woodland with some conifers is favoured for breeding, including parkland and gardens.

Behaviour and ecology
This species does not form large flocks outside the breeding season, and is usually seen as a pair or family group.

Breeding
It builds its nest in a bush, (preferably more than four metres tall and wide), mature stands of scrub, or tree, laying four to seven pale blue eggs which are mottled with red-brown. It is peculiar among the Passeriformes for having spermatozoa with a rounded head and a blunt acrosome.  This species produces two or three broods per season, from early May to mid-July.

Food and feeding

The food is mainly seeds and buds of fruit trees, which can make it a pest in orchards: in England, for centuries every parish paid a bounty for every Eurasian bullfinch killed. Ash and hawthorn are favoured in autumn and early winter.  If wild bird cover is planted for it, kale, quinoa and millet are preferred, next to tall hedges or woodland.

References

External links
 Audio recording from Xeno-canto
 Ageing and sexing by Javier Blasco-Zumeta & Gerd-Michael Heinze
 Feathers of Eurasian Bullfinch (Pyrrhula pyrrhula) 

Articles containing video clips
Birds described in 1758
Birds of Eurasia
Pyrrhula
Taxa named by Carl Linnaeus